Delbert Riley is a Canadian First Nations leader of Chippewa background. He was chief of the National Indian Brotherhood (known today as the Assembly of First Nations) from 1980 to 1982.

He is originally from the Chippewas of the Thames near St. Thomas, Ontario. He graduated from the University of Western Ontario.

Delbert Riley also presided over the Union of Ontario Indians.

References

External links
 AFN: Chief profiles
 AFN Youth Digitization Website Project: Delbert Riley

Ojibwe people
Assembly of First Nations chiefs
Living people
University of Western Ontario alumni
1941 births